Josiel Alberto Núñez Rivera (born 29 January 1993) is a Panamanian footballer who plays for CF Intercity in the Tercera División.

Club career
In December 2018, Núñez was loaned out to USL League One side Forward Madison FC ahead of their inaugural season. He made his league debut for the club on April 6, 2019 in a 1-0 away defeat to Chattanooga Red Wolves SC. He scored his first league goal for the club on April 19, 2019, scoring in the 58th minute of Madison's first league win in club history, a 2-1 victory over Orlando City B. His goal, assisted by Paulo Junior, made the score 1-1. For the season 22-23 he signs for Recreativo de Huelva, which is competing on Spanish 2nd RFEF.

International career
Núñez made his debut for Panama in an August 2014 friendly match against Peru and has, as of 17 April 2018, earned a total of 14 caps, scoring 2 goals.

International goals
Scores and results list Panama's goal tally first.

References

External links 
 
 
 

1993 births
Living people
Association football midfielders
Panamanian footballers
Panama international footballers
C.D. Plaza Amador players
Footballers at the 2015 Pan American Games
Pan American Games competitors for Panama
2017 Copa Centroamericana players
2017 CONCACAF Gold Cup players
Forward Madison FC players
USL League One players
CF Intercity players